Louis Richard (March 1, 1817 – November 13, 1876) was a businessman and politician in Quebec, Canada. He represented the Kennebec division  in the Legislative Council of Quebec, the upper chamber of the Legislature of Quebec.

Richard was born at Saint-Grégoire-le-Grand, Bécancour) on March 1, 1817. His parents were a farming couple, Charles-Auguste Richard and Marie-Esther Hébert.

Educated at Saint-Grégoire, he became a farmer in Stanfold county in 1840. He later opened a general store and became involved in the lumber trade. In 1841, he married Hermine Prince. The couple had a son, Édouard Richard, who was a Member of Parliament in the House of Commons from 1872 to 1878.

He was the mayor of Princeville for one year (1857), and then again from 1872 until his death. He was an unsuccessful candidate for the Legislative Council of the Province of Canada for the Kennebec division in 1862.

In 1874, he was named to the Legislative Council of Quebec for the Kennebec division, as a supporter of the Conservative Party of Quebec. He held the position until his death in office in 1876.

External links 

 National Assembly of Quebec, Québec Dictionary of Parliamentary Biography, from 1764 to the present: Louis Richard.
 Dictionary of Canadian Biography: Richard, Louis-Eusèbe.

1817 births
1876 deaths
Conservative Party of Quebec MLCs